Milan Uzelac (1950, Vršac, Vojvodina, Serbia, Yugoslavia) is a Serbian poet, essayist, PhD, full Professor of Ontology and Aesthetics of the  University of Novi Sad (Serbia)

Milan Uzelac was born on 8 April 1950 in Vršac (Serbia), where he received his elementary and secondary education. He studied Philosophy at the University of Belgrade, where he got his B.A. (1974) and M.A. (1980) degrees and was awarded a doctorate in philosophy from the University of Zagreb in 1985. He worked as a lecturer at the Teacher Training College in Kikinda (1981–1986), and his affiliation with the University of Novi Sad started in 1986, when he became an assistant professor in Theory of Art and Sociology of Art (1986–1990), then an associate professor in Esthetics (1990–1995). In 1995 he became a professor of philosophy at the University of Novi Sad, where he teaches courses in Esthetics and Ontology. At the Academy of Arts (University of Novi Sad) he teaches Esthetics, Philosophy of Music and History of Philosophy. In the period between October 2007 and summer 2010 he was a Professor of Middle Age and New Age Philosophy and Ontology at the Philosophical Faculty in Kosovska Mitrovica at the Department of Philosophy and Sociology. Since February 2011 he has been a Professor of the Main Streams of Contemporary Philosophy, Philosophy of Aesthetic Education and the Philosophical Grounds of Modern Pedagogic Theories at the Preschool Teacher Training College in Vršac.

He is the author of numerous monographs and coursebooks in philosophy, history of philosophy, esthetics, esthetics of art, esthetics of music, poetics, etc. His publications also include several volumes of poetry collections.

Milan Uzelac participates regularly at international conferences in philosophy. He presented his papers in Madrid, Freiburg/Br., Cologne, Jena, Dubrovnik, Riga, Reggio Emilia, Zagreb, Moscow, Krasnodar and Ohio and published in Germany, the United States, Russia, Italy, the Czech Republic and Japan.

He is a member of national and international professional and academic associations, including Deutsche Gesellschaft für phänomenologische Forschung (Trier, Germany, 1991), Assotiation internationale des critiques d'art (Paris, France), The International Board of Advisors of Center for Advanced Research in Phenomenology (Boca Raton, Florida, USA), The Association of Writers of Serbia (1974), the Writers' Society of Vojvodina (1980), The Estheatics Society of Serbia (1980) and the Journalists' Association of Serbia (2005), Deutsche Gesellschaft für Philosophie (Muenster, Germany, 2014), Martin-Heidegger-Gesellschaft, (Messkirch, Germany, 2014).

He was awarded the Vršac Liberation Day Prize in 1999.

References

External links
 Official Site
  Milan Uzelac

1950 births
Living people
People from Vršac
Serbian male poets
Ontologists
University of Belgrade Faculty of Philosophy alumni
Academic staff of the University of Novi Sad
University of Zagreb alumni
Serbian writers